Ghana, or the Republic of Ghana, is a modern nation in Lower West Africa. 

Ghana may also refer to:
 Ghana Empire, a medieval empire in Upper West Africa
 Għana (folk music), a type of Maltese folk music
 Ghana (album), an album by the Mountain Goats
 Ghana (chocolate), a chocolate brand manufactured by Korean company Lotte
 Ghana (Mbeya ward), a ward in Tanzania

See also
 Gana (disambiguation)
 Gold Coast (region)
 Guinea
 Guyana